Blue Nude may refer to:
Blue Nude (Souvenir de Biskra) by Matisse
Blue Nudes, a series of blue painted paper cutouts executed in 1952 by Matisse
Blue Nude (Picasso) by Picasso, painted during his blue period
Blue Nude (Bonnard) by Pierre Bonnard
"Blue Nude", a song by Babylon Zoo